Heteropoda kandiana is a species of spiders of the genus Heteropoda. It is native to India and Sri Lanka.

See also
 List of Sparassidae species

References

Spiders described in 1899
Sparassidae
Arthropods of India
Spiders of Asia